Maulana Azad University (MAU), is a State university located at Jodhpur, Rajasthan, India. It was officially established in 2013 by Marwar Muslim Educational & Welfare Society under Rajasthan State Government Act No. 35 (2013) with the right to confer degree as per the sections 2(f) of the UGC Act, 1956, 

Maulana Azad University offers undergraduate, postgraduate and Ph.D. programmes in the fields of engineering & technology, science, medical science, arts, commerce, management, humanities and social science. Some of the courses are BSc, BA, MA and MSc.

References

External links
 

Education in Jodhpur
Universities in Rajasthan
Educational institutions established in 2013
2013 establishments in Rajasthan
State universities in India